The 1922 United States House of Representatives elections in South Carolina were held on November 7, 1922, to select seven Representatives for two-year terms from the state of South Carolina.  Six incumbents were re-elected and the open seat in the 6th congressional district was retained by the Democrats.  The composition of the state delegation thus remained solely Democratic.

1st congressional district
Incumbent Democratic Congressman W. Turner Logan of the 1st congressional district, in office since 1921, won the Democratic primary and defeated Republican challenger S.L. Bomgren in the general election.

Democratic primary

General election results

|-
| 
| colspan=5 |Democratic hold
|-

2nd congressional district
Incumbent Democratic Congressman James F. Byrnes of the 2nd congressional district, in office since 1911, was unopposed in his bid for re-election.

General election results

|-
| 
| colspan=5 |Democratic hold
|-

3rd congressional district
Incumbent Democratic Congressman Frederick H. Dominick of the 3rd congressional district, in office since 1917, won the Democratic primary and was unopposed in the general election.

Democratic primary

General election results

|-
| 
| colspan=5 |Democratic hold
|-

4th congressional district
Incumbent Democratic Congressman John J. McSwain of the 4th congressional district, in office since 1921, defeated Republican challenger M.P. Norwood.

General election results

|-
| 
| colspan=5 |Democratic hold
|-

5th congressional district
Incumbent Democratic Congressman William F. Stevenson of the 5th congressional district, in office since 1917, was unopposed in his bid for re-election.

General election results

|-
| 
| colspan=5 |Democratic hold
|-

6th congressional district
Incumbent Democratic Congressman Philip H. Stoll of the 6th congressional district, in office since 1919, was defeated in the Democratic primary by Allard H. Gasque.  He was unopposed in the general election.

Democratic primary

General election results

|-
| 
| colspan=5 |Democratic hold
|-

7th congressional district
Incumbent Democratic Congressman Hampton P. Fulmer of the 7th congressional district, in office since 1921, won the Democratic primary and defeated Republican challenger J.C. Etheridge in the general election.

Democratic primary

General election results

|-
| 
| colspan=5 |Democratic hold
|-

See also
United States House of Representatives elections, 1922
South Carolina gubernatorial election, 1922
South Carolina's congressional districts

References

"Report of the Secretary of State to the General Assembly of South Carolina.  Part II." Reports of State Officers Boards and Committees to the General Assembly of the State of South Carolina. Volume I. Columbia, SC: 1923, pp. 58–60.

South Carolina
1922
1922 South Carolina elections